Petr Vronský (born 1946) is a Czech conductor. From 1983-1991 he conducted the Brno Philharmonic Orchestra. He currently conducts the Moravian Philharmonic.

References

External links
Biography
Biography (scroll down)

Czech conductors (music)
Male conductors (music)
1946 births
Living people
21st-century conductors (music)
21st-century Czech male musicians